Chris Stritzel also called Le Shuuk (born 28 November 1987 in Stuttgart) is a German DJ.

Biography 
2005 Le Shuuk started out as a Resident DJ and signed his first recording contract.

2015 he produced the hymn of the World Club Dome where he played mainstage.

Le Shuuk regularly releases a Podcast called Loud & Proud.

Discography

Singles
 Kick the Big Ben
 Le Shuuk & E-mine – Hey Mister! (2011)
 Le Shuuk & Croaky – Hey Mister! (2014)
 Le Shuuk & Croaky – Wonderland (2014)
 Le Shuuk & Mark Bale – Far Out
 Le Shuuk – Scream!
 Le Shuuk – Seth
 Le Shuuk & Joebe Feat. Ahromat – What The Fuuk
 Le Shuuk feat. Chase Holfelder – Next to You (2015)
 Tai & Le Shuuk – Unicorn (2015)
 Le Shuuk & Cuebrick – Reality (2016)
 Le Shuuk - Evil (2016)
 Le Shuuk & ItaloBrothers - Hurry (2023)

Remixes
 Noize Generation (feat. Patrik Jean) – A Song For You (Le Shuuk Remix)
 Mynoorey – Million Lights (Le Shuuk Radio Mix)
 Mynoorey – Million Lights (Le Shuuk Club Mix)
 Niels van Gogh & Dave Ramone – Kick It (Le Shuuk Remix)
 Niels van Gogh ft. Princess Superstar – Miami (Le Shuuk Remix)
 Brooklyn Bounce – Loud & Proud (Le Shuuk Mix)
 Chico Chiquita – Ready, Aim, Fire! (Le Shuuk Radio Mix)
 Timbo – Rule The Night (Le Shuuk Remix)
 Dario Rodriguez – MFKIN (Le Shuuk Remix)
 Marco Petralia & Rubin feat. Ilan Green – Coming Home (Le Shuuk Remix)
 Alle Farben, ILIRA - Fading (Le Shuuk Remix)

External links 

 Le Shuuk Soundcloud

References 

1987 births
German DJs
Living people
Electronic dance music DJs